Artopoetes pryeri is a small butterfly found in the East Palearctic (Northeast China South Amur, Ussuri, Korea, Japan) that belongs to the lycaenids or blues family.

Description

L. pryeri Murr. (83 e). Very large, above with a broad dark margin, the basal area violet, in the male the disc also violet, but in the female whitish. Underside white with 2 rows of dark dots near the margin. — In Amurland and Japan, not rare, in June and July. The species looks on the wing like a Pierid. The  larva on Syringa amurensis, full-grown in June (Doerries). This aberrant-looking form might likewise be placed into a separate genus.

See also
List of butterflies of Russia

References

Theclini